Harmony Islands Marine Provincial Park is a provincial park in British Columbia, Canada, located on the east side of Hotham Sound, which is a side-inlet of the lower reaches of Jervis Inlet, on that inlet's north side roughly opposite the mouth of Sechelt Inlet.

References

Provincial parks of British Columbia
Sunshine Coast Regional District
1992 establishments in British Columbia
Protected areas established in 1992
Marine parks of Canada